Martin Morning is a French animated TV series of 78 13-minute episodes, created in 2002 by Denis Olivieri, Claude Prothée, Luc Vinciguerra, Jacky Bretaudeau, produced by Millimages in association with Les Cartooneurs Associés. Animation was processed by the Shanghai Jingri Animation Company.

Synopsis
Martin, an ordinary nine-year-old boy, has one strange characteristic: every morning he awakes to find himself transformed into fantastic and legendary beings – a Merlin-like wizard, pharaoh, the caveman, a vampire, a superhero and many more transformations. Despite the transformations, he goes to school with his friends, and adventures then ensue.

Characters
 Martin Morning, the title character, is an otherwise ordinary nine-year-old boy, who finds himself transformed every morning into extraordinary forms.
 Grosmot is Martin's best friend and, despite Martin's misgivings, the biggest fan of his transformations and the subsequent adventures.
 Roxanne is the top of Gromo and Martin's primary school class. She is Martin's girlfriend, she participates in Martin's transformation adventures even though, sometimes she doesn't like it when Martin transforms. In season 2 she doesn't get upset with Martin very often.
 Mr. Grinsle is the assistant principal of Martin's school, and believes Martin to be a menace, due to his transformations. He believes Mr. Pickle is too soft on the students, particularly Martin, and wishes to take his place as principal.
 Mr. Pickle is the principal of Martin's School.
Toughy The school bully who always bullies Martin and his friends.
Nat the red-haired girl from episode 53 "Martin mène l'enquête"

Episodes
Season 1
1. Mighty Dragon Martin
2. Martin's Dog Day
3. Super Martin
4. Martin Multiplied
5. His Majesty Martin
6. Cro-Magnon Martin
7. Martin is Missing
8. Martin's Space Odyssey
9. Charming Martin
10. Magic Martin
11. Agent Martin 008
12. Martin Enters the Dance
13. Ancient Egyptian Martin
14. A Good Little Devil
15. Martin Megastar
16. Martin's Prehistoric Pal
17. Martin Musketeer
18. Mac Martin Mac Morning
19. Mini Martin
20. Sherlock Martin

Season 2
5. Martin's Fairytale

References

External links 
 
 Serial sheet on mediatoon-distribution.com

2000s French animated television series
2010s French animated television series
2003 French television series debuts
2018 French television series endings
French children's animated adventure television series
Australian Broadcasting Corporation original programming
BBC children's television shows
Animated television series about children